Marcus Sergius or Servius Octavius Laenas Pontianus was a Roman politician of the early second century.  He served as consul in AD 131, alongside Marcus Antonius Rufinus, during the reign of Hadrian.

Name
Pontianus is not mentioned in ancient writers, and although his name occurs in a number of inscriptions, his precise nomenclature is uncertain.  His praenomen is given as Marcus in an inscription from Samothrace, but in all other inscriptions he is either Servius or Sergius.  Servius could be either a praenomen or a nomen gentilicium; both were widespread, but not particularly common.  The gentile name Sergius was better known, and frequently substituted for Servius in inscriptions; this may explain why several inscriptions record Pontianus' name using the standard abbreviation for Servius, while in others it was apparently written Sergius.  However, the abbreviation could be used for the gentile name Servius as well as the praenomen; and further complicating matters, in imperial times it was not uncommon for members of the Roman aristocracy to possess part or all of two or more complete nomenclatures.  Thus, it is entirely possible for Pontianus to have been named Marcus Sergius Octavius, Marcus Servius Octavius, Sergius Octavius, or Servius Octavius, in which Marcus, Servius, or both could be praenomina.

A small amount of epigraphic evidence weighs in favour of Sergius in connection with the Octavia gens, which regularly used the praenomen Marcus, but not Servius.  A second-century inscription from Vienna in Gallia Narbonensis mentions a Marcus Sergius Octavius, who dedicated a grave for his mother, Vennonia Iarilla; but given the location and his mother's name, it is doubtful whether he is the same man.  An undated inscription from Rome mentions a boy, Sergius Octavius Caricus, buried by his father, who is not named.  But perhaps the best indication of whether Pontianus inherited the name Servius or Sergius comes from the tomb of Nerva's mother, apparently Pontianus' great-aunt: according to the inscription, her name was "Sergia Plautilla", and she was the daughter of a Laenas, Pontianus' proavus.

Descent
Pontianus was probably born in the late first century to an otherwise unknown Octavius Laenas; the surname Pontianus suggests that his mother may have been named Pontia.  Because so little is known of his life, his historical significance is based less on his consulship, which seems to have been uneventful, and more on his relationship to Nerva.

Besides the inscriptions mentioning his consulship, Pontianus had a monument built at Tusculum in memory of his grandmother, Rubellia Bassa, the daughter of Gaius Rubellius Blandus. In the paternal line, Pontianus was related to the emperor Nerva. The emperor's mother, Sergia Plautilla, was a sister of Gaius Octavius Laenas, consul in AD 33, and the husband of Rubellia Bassa, making Pontianus the emperor's first cousin once removed.

Career
Pontianus was consul for the first four months of AD 131, alongside Marcus Antonius Rufinus, about midway through the reign of Hadrian.  The emperor was away from Rome, visiting Egypt during their consulship, which seems to have been uneventful.  Although the consulship remained the chief executive magistracy, under the authority of the emperors, much of its significance—and the reason why several different pairs of consuls shared the office each year—was to prepare able administrators to hold provincial governorships and other important positions throughout the empire.  But while Pontianus probably held a variety of magistracies and other appointments before and after the consulship, none of the inscriptions mentioning him give any details of his career, except that he seems to have been a member of the College of Pontiffs.

See also
 Octavia gens

Footnotes

References 

 Theodor Mommsen et alii, Corpus Inscriptionum Latinarum (The Body of Latin Inscriptions, abbreviated CIL), Berlin-Brandenburgische Akademie der Wissenschaften (1853–present).
 Notizie degli Scavi di Antichità (News of Excavations from Antiquity, abbreviated NSA), Accademia dei Lincei (1876–present).
 René Cagnat et alii, L'Année épigraphique (The Year in Epigraphy, abbreviated AE), Presses Universitaires de France (1888–present).
 Ronald Syme, "The Marriage of Rubellius Blandus", in American Journal of Philology, vol. 103, No. 1, pp. 62–85 (Spring 1982).
 Zeitschrift für Papyrologie und Epigraphik (Journal of Papyrology and Epigraphy, abbreviated ZPE), (1987).
 Benet Salway, "What’s in a Name?  A Survey of Roman Onomastic Practice from c. 700 B.C. to A.D. 700", in Journal of Roman Studies, vol. 84, pp. 124–145 (1994).
 John D. Grainger, Nerva and the Roman Succession Crisis of AD 96–99, Routledge (2003).

1st-century Romans
2nd-century Romans
Imperial Roman consuls
Octavii
Pontifices